Events from the year 1913 in Denmark.

Incumbents
 Monarch – Christian X
 Prime minister – Klaus Berntsen (until 21 June), Carl Theodor Zahle

Events
 26 July – 1897 Gentofte train crash in Jutland.
 23 August – The Little Mermaid is inaugurated at its current location off Langelinie in Copenhagen.
 2 December – Karen Blixen leaves her native Rungstedlund and Denmark to settle in Kenya where she will live for the next almost 28 years on her African farm.

Undated

Sports
 31 August  Thorvald Ellegaard wins silver in men's sprint at the 1901 UCI Track Cycling World Championships.
 2 November  Boldklubben 1913 is founded.

Date unknown
 Kjøbenhavns Boldklub wins the first  Danish National Football Tournament by defeating Boldklubben af 1901 62 in the final.

Births
 2 February – Poul Reichhardt, actor (died 1985)
 13 July – Mærsk Mc-Kinney Møller, shipping magnate (died 2012)
 17 September – Jørgen Jersild, composer and music educator (died 2004)
 23 September – Carl-Henning Pedersen, painter (died 2007)

Deaths
 28 February – Johan Hansen, businessman (born 1838)
 9 March – Jacob Kornerup, archeologist (born 1825)
 19 March – Christian Zacho, painter (born 1843)
 20 April – Vilhelm Bissen, sculptor (born 1836)
 16 June – Frederikke Federspiel, photographer (born 1839)
 25 July – Peter Sabroe, politician (born 1867)
 11 August – Natalie Zahle, reform pedagogue and pioneer on women's education (born 1827)
 24 December – J.B.S. Estrup, politician, prime minister of Denmark (born 1825)

References

 
Denmark
Years of the 20th century in Denmark
1910s in Denmark
Denmark